Horacio Nicolás Erpen Bariffo (born 29 August 1981, in Concepción del Uruguay) is an Argentine association footballer who plays as a winger for the Italian club Crema 1908. Although he is originally from the Entre Ríos Province, he holds both Argentine and Italian citizenship.

Career
On 15 July 2010 he joined Sorrento on a free transfer. On 11 July 2011 Erpen reached a mutual agreement with Sorrento, his club at the time, to terminate his contract.
After his experience with Juve Stabia, on 7 January 2013 he moved to Pro Vercelli.

Style of play
A versatile and creative left-footed player, Erpen is capable of playing in several attacking and midfield positions: primarily a right winger, he has also been used as an attacking midfielder, or as a central striker. He is mainly known for his accuracy from set-pieces and his ability to provide assists for teammates.

References

External links
 profile at Tenfield
 Sassuolo Calcio
 Tuttocalciatori profile

1981 births
Living people
Argentine footballers
Argentine expatriate footballers
Expatriate footballers in Uruguay
Expatriate footballers in Italy
Serie B players
Serie C players
Tacuarembó F.C. players
Club Nacional de Football players
Venezia F.C. players
U.S. Triestina Calcio 1918 players
U.S. Sassuolo Calcio players
S.S. Juve Stabia players
F.C. Pro Vercelli 1892 players
S.S. Arezzo players
Association football midfielders
Sportspeople from Entre Ríos Province
Argentine people of German descent
Argentine expatriate sportspeople in Italy